G.O.G. 666 is a science fiction novel by author John Taine (pseudonym of Eric Temple Bell). It was first published in 1954 by Fantasy Press in an edition of 1,815 copies.

Plot introduction
The novel concerns Russian genetics experiments resulting in a being that is half ape, half brain.

Reception
Anthony Boucher received the novel unfavorably, describing it as "slow and muddled" and saying that "Neither story nor science can stand comparison with Taine's best work." P. Schuyler Miller reported that "it's not the best Taine." New Worlds reviewer Leslie Flood dismissed the novel as "science-fiction of the most boring and tasteless sort", saying "this literary lapse of a once-great fantasy author should have suffered the oblivion it deserved, had it not been for the overenthusiasm of a specialist science-fiction press".

References

1954 American novels
1954 science fiction novels
American science fiction novels
Works by Eric Temple Bell
Works published under a pseudonym
Novels set in Russia
Fantasy Press books